Tonka is an American producer of toy trucks. The company is known for making steel toy models of construction type trucks and machinery. Maisto International, which makes diecast vehicles, acquired the rights to use the Tonka name in a line of 1:64 scale, featuring mostly trucks.

History 

Tonka began as Mound Metalcraft, a gardening tools company, in the fall of 1946 in Mound, Minnesota. Lynn Everett Baker (1898–1964), Avery F. Crounse, and Alvin F. Tesch created the company in an old schoolhouse. Their building's former occupant, the Streater Company, had made and patented several toys, including toy trucks. E. C. Streater was not interested in the toy business so they approached Mound Metalcraft. The three men at Mound Metalcraft thought they might make a good sideline to their other products.

After some modifications to the design by Alvin Tesch and the addition of a new logo created by Erling Eklof, the company began selling metal toys, which soon became the primary business. The logo was based on a University of Minnesota drafting student's sketch by Donald B. Olson, who later became the company's Chief Industrial Engineer. The logo used the Dakota Sioux word tanka, which means "great" or "big".

In November 1955, Mound Metalcraft changed its name to Tonka Toys Incorporated. From 1947 to 1957, their logo was an oval, showing the Tonka Toys name in red above blue ocean waves with seagulls overhead, honoring nearby Lake Minnetonka.

From 1958 to 1961, the logo no longer included seagulls and the colors were changed to white, grey, and red. The colors changed to red and gold in 1963. In 1978, the oval was removed and the company began using only the name Tonka on their toys.

In 1964, Tonka acquired the Mell Manufacturing Company in Chicago, Illinois, allowing it to produce barbecue grills, eventually under the Tonka Firebowl label. 

In 1987, Tonka purchased Kenner Parker, including UK toy giant Palitoy, for $555 million, borrowing extensively to fund the acquisition. However, the cost of servicing the debt meant Tonka itself had to find a buyer and it was eventually acquired by Hasbro in 1991. In 1998, Hasbro began a licensing deal with Funrise Toys to manufacture and distribute Tonka trucks. The deal began with versions of the trucks fitted with electronics for lights and sounds, but grew to encompass the entire brand. This agreement ended in 2020, with the license being transferred to Basic Fun!, who produces other brands such as Care Bears, My Little Pony, and Lincoln Logs.

Tonka has produced a variety of toys, including dolls (Star Fairies, Bathing Beauties, Maple Town, and Hollywoods). They have produced other toys, some aimed at girls (such as Keypers), and others aimed at boys (such as Gobots, Supernaturals, Rock Lords, Spiral Zone, Legions of Power and Steel Monsters). It was the original manufacturer of the Pound Puppies toy line, and in the late 1980s licensed products inspired by Maple Town.

Tonka produced video games as Tonka Video Games, including Tonka Raceway, and purchased the rights to distribute and market the Sega Master System after Sega of America stopped competing against the Nintendo Entertainment System in the US. However, the Master System's market share declined, since Tonka did not have experience with video games or how to market them. Hasbro sold the digital gaming rights for various properties (including My Little Pony, Magic: The Gathering, Tonka, Playskool, and Transformers) to Infogrames (later known and currently operating as Atari SA) for US$100 million in 2000, buying back the rights for US$66 million in June 2005.

In 2001, Tonka trucks were inducted into the National Toy Hall of Fame at The Strong in Rochester, New York.  The Winifred Museum in Winifred, Montana, has a collection of more than 3,000 Tonka toys.

In other media

Video games 
Thirteen video games based on the toys were released between 1996 and 2006. A majority of these titles were released by Hasbro Interactive and it's later rebrandings as Infogrames Interactive and Atari Interactive, although a small number of titles for Nintendo platforms were released by TDK Mediactive under a sub-licensing agreement from Infogrames.

Filmography

TV series

TV movies and specials

Films 

In 2012, an animated film based on the trucks toy line was in development. It was to be produced by Sony Pictures Animation, Hasbro Studios, and Happy Madison Productions, and to be distributed by Columbia Pictures. A script was written by Happy Madison alumnus Fred Wolf, and was to be produced by Adam Sandler and Jack Giarraputo,  Brian Goldner (CEO and president of Hasbro) and Bennett Schneir (Hasbro's senior vice president and managing director of motion pictures).

Music 
On April 2, 2021, American rapper Yeat released the song "Tonka". The song's sequel, titled "Tonka 2", was released on August 5, 2021. Another track titled "Big Tonka" featuring Lil Uzi Vert was released on April 1, 2022. Yeat has also referenced Tonka throughout his lyrics.

Sports 
Lance Lynn, an MLB baseball pitcher for the Chicago White Sox is nicknamed "Tonka Truck."

References

External links 

 

 
Toy companies of the United States
Toy cars and trucks
Manufacturing companies based in Minnesota
American companies established in 1946
Toy companies established in 1946
1946 establishments in Minnesota
1950s toys
Hasbro subsidiaries
1991 mergers and acquisitions
2011 mergers and acquisitions
2020 mergers and acquisitions